Bosnia and Herzegovina competed at the World Games 2017 in Wroclaw, Poland, from the 20th to the 30th of July 2017.

Competitors

References

2017
Nations at the 2017 World Games
2017 in Bosnia and Herzegovina sport